Zachary Aguilar (born February 21, 1998) is an American voice actor who has appeared in various English dubbed versions of Japanese anime and video games, working for Bang Zoom! Entertainment, Viz Media and Funimation. Aguilar's first major role was Genos in One Punch Man, and has since appeared as Tanjiro Kamado in Demon Slayer: Kimetsu no Yaiba, Koichi Hirose in JoJo's Bizarre Adventure: Diamond Is Unbreakable, Arthur Pendragon in The Seven Deadly Sins and David Martinez in Cyberpunk: Edgerunners. 

He is also known for his roles in video games, such as Byleth Eisner in Fire Emblem: Three Houses, Aether in Genshin Impact, Espresso Cookie in Cookie Run: Kingdom, Campanella in The Legend of Heroes: Trails of Cold Steel IV, and Calem in Pokémon Masters.

Filmography

Anime

Video games

Awards and nominations

References

External links 
 
 
 
 

1998 births
Living people
21st-century American male actors
Male actors from Los Angeles
American child actors
American martial artists
American male video game actors
American male voice actors
American people of Irish descent
American people of Spanish descent
Place of birth missing (living people)
Hispanic and Latino American male actors
Crunchyroll Anime Awards winners